Ocular albinism is a form of albinism which, in contrast to oculocutaneous albinism, presents primarily in the eyes.  There are multiple forms of ocular albinism, which are clinically similar.

Both known genes are on the X chromosome. When the term "autosomal recessive ocular albinism" ("AROA") is used, it usually refers to mild variants of oculocutaneous albinism rather than ocular albinism, which is X-linked.


Types

References

External links 

  GeneReviews/NCBI/NIH/UW entry on Ocular Albinism, X-Linked

Albinism
Amino acid metabolism disorders
X-linked recessive disorders